Abberton Hall is a small country house in the village of Abberton, Worcestershire, England, near Pershore.

History

It is an irregular two-story house, faced with modern brick, with at its core the timber-framed house of the Sheldon family, with a brick facade and a massive stone chimneybreast (dated 1619). Abberton Hall was the seat of William Laslett, Member of Parliament (MP) for Worcester. This was also the home of Benjamin Gibbon (born 1914), who created murals in the garden loggia, dated to 1937.

References

Biography
J.B. Burke, A Visitation of Seats and Arms of the Noblemen and Gentlemen of Great Britain and Ireland, 1852–55, ii, p. 175
Country Life,  lxxxi, p. 24
R. Lockett, A survey of historic parks and gardens in Worcestershire, 1997, p. 3
Sir N. Pevsner, The buildings of England: Worcestershire, 1968, p. 68
P. Reid, Burke's & Savill's Guide to Country Houses: vol. 2, Herefordshore, Shropshire, Warwickshire and Worcestershire, 1980 p. 191 (contains illustration)

Attribution

External links
 

Country houses in Worcestershire
Grade II listed buildings in Worcestershire